This is a list of active and extinct volcanoes.

References

External links

Volcanoes of Hawaii and the Pacific Ocean

French Polynesia
French Polynesia-related lists